This article describes the properties of nouns in the Adyghe language.

Definiteness
Definiteness is marked in nouns by the noun suffixes ~р and ~м. Indefiniteness is unmarked, i.e. the absence of the markers ~р and ~м indicates indefiniteness, for example : 

 Кӏалэм мыӏэрыс ешхы - "the boy is eating an apple".
 Кӏалэм мыӏэрысыр ешхы - "the boy is eating the apple".

Noun

Noun cases
Plurality is indicated by the suffix '-хэ' 

кӏалэ  ('boy') becomes кӏалэхэ  ('boys').
шы  ('horse') becomes шыхэ  ('horses').

Adyghe also declines nouns into four different cases, each with corresponding suffixes: absolutive, ergative, instrumental, and Adverbial.

Absolutive case
Has the suffix ~р  (e.g. кӏалэр  'the boy', кӏалэхэр  ('the boys')). It acts as the subject of intransitive verbs and the direct object of transitive verbs. A noun in the absolutive case also indicates that its state is being changed by verb, i.e. they are either created, altered, moved or ended by the verb.

For example, in the sentence "The man is going", the state of the noun man is changing because he is moving (going), thus the noun man will be in the Absolutive case.

Another example is "The girl eats the apple", here the state of the noun apple changes because it is ceasing to exist (being eaten), the state of the noun girl does not change though because the verb "to eat" does not indicate how the girl eats (opening mouth, biting, etc.), thus the noun apple will be in the Absolutive case and not the noun girl.

This case has two main functions:

Marking the subject of intransitive verbs
{|
|-
|кӏалэр|| еджапӏэм || кӏуагъэ
|-
|кӏалэ-р||еджапӏэ-м || кӏо-агъэ
|-
| ||  || 
|-
|the boy (abs.) || the school (erg.) || (s)he went
|-
|colspan=3|"the boy went to the school"
|}
Marking the direct object of transitive verbs
{|
|-
|бзылъфыгъэм || джанэр || егъэкъабзэ
|-
|бзылъфыгъэ-м || джанэ-р || егъэкъабзэ
|-
| || || 
|-
|the woman (erg.) || the shirt (abs.) || (s)he cleans
|-
|colspan=3|"the woman cleans the shirt"
|}

Ergative-Oblique case
Has the suffix -м  (e.g. кӏалэм  'the boy's', кӏалэхэм  'the boys). It has two main roles: Ergative role and Oblique role.

The Ergative role marks the subject of transitive verbs. They cause the object to change by doing the verb. For example, in the sentence "The girl eats the apple", the noun girl will get the Ergative case because she is changing the object's state (apple) by eating it.

The Oblique role marks the indirect object of both transitive and intransitive verbs. For example, in the sentence "The boy is playing the guitar", the noun guitar will get the Oblique case because it is the object of the intransitive verb еон "to play". Unlike the absolute case, nouns in the Oblique case have no indication of state change, for instance, in the sentence "The boy hits the man", even though the noun man is the object of the sentence, we have no indication how the verb hit effects him (getting hurt by the hit? not feeling a thing?).

Two examples of this case with its two main functions: 

 Marking the subject of transitive verbs (ergative role)

{|
|-
|бзылъфыгъэм || джанэр || егъэкъабзэ
|-
|бзылъфыгъэ-м || джанэ-р || егъэкъабзэ
|-
| || ||
|-
|the woman (erg.) || the shirt (abs.) || (s)he cleans
|-
|colspan=3|"the woman cleans the shirt"
|}

 Marking the object of both intransitive and transitive verbs (oblique role)

{|
|-
|кӏалэр || тхылъым || еджэ
|-
|кӏалэ-р || тхылъ-ым || еджэ
|-
| || ||
|-
|the boy (abs.)|| the book (obl.) || (s)he reads
|-
|colspan=3|"the boy reads the book"
|}

{|
|-
|кӏалэм || мыӏэрысэр || пшъашъэм || реты
|-
|кӏалэ-м || мыӏэрысэ-р || пшъашъэ-м || реты
|-
| || || ||
|-
|the boy (erg.)|| the apple (abs.) ||  the girl (obl.) || (s)he gives it to
|-
|colspan=4|"the boy gives the apple to the girl"
|}

The Oblique role is also used similarly to the dative case, by marking nouns that follow prepositions (see: preposition prefixes). For example in the sentence Кӏалэр унэм ихьагъ "the boy went inside the house", the preposition is the prefix и- (inside) and the noun house is in the Oblique case.

{|
|-
|кӏалэм || мыжъор || дэпкъым || тедзэ
|-
|кӏалэ-м || мыжъо-р || дэпкъы-м || те-дзэ
|-
| || ||||
|-
|the boy (erg.)|| the rock (abs.) ||the wall (obl.) || (s)he throws it on
|-
|colspan=4|"the boy throws the rock on the wall"
|}

{|
|-
|еджакӏор || еджапӏэм || щеджэ
|-
|еджакӏо-р || еджапӏэ-м || ще-джэ
|-
| || ||
|-
|the boy (abs.)|| school (obl.) || (s)he studies in
|-
|colspan=3|"the boy studies in school"
|}

{|
|-
|дзакӏор || заум || хэукӏыхьагъ
|-
|дзакӏо-р || зау-м || хэ-укӏыхьагъ
|-
| || ||
|-
|the soldier (abs.)|| the war (obl.) || (s)he died in
|-
|colspan=3|"the soldier died in the war."
|}
The Ergative-Oblique case can also be used to mark the noun that possesses a property or an attribute.

{|
|-
|кӏалэм|| иунэ || дахэ
|-
|кӏалэ-м|| и-унэ || дахэ
|-
| || ||
|-
|the boy (erg.)|| his house || beautiful
|-
|colspan=3|"the house of the boy is beautiful"
|}

Instrumental–directional case
Has the suffix -мкӏэ  or -кӏэ  (e.g. кӏалэмкӏэ  'using the boy', кӏалэкӏэ  'using a boy', кӏалэхэмкӏэ  'using the boys', кӏалэхэкӏэ  'using boys').

 Marking the instrument or tool of action:
 къэлэм /qalam/ pencil → къэлэмкӏэ /qalamt͡ʃʼa/ using a pencil.
 къэлэм /qalam/ pencil → къэлэмымкӏэ /qalaməmt͡ʃʼa/ using the pencil.
 уатэ /waːta/ hammer → уатэкӏэ /waːtat͡ʃʼa/ using a hammer.
 уатэ /waːta/ hammer → уатэмкӏэ /waːtamt͡ʃʼa/ using the hammer.
{|
|-
|ыцӏэр || къэлэмымкӏэ || къитхэгъ
|-
|ы-цIэ-эр || къэлэм-ымкIэ || къи-тхы-эгъ
|-
| || ||
|-
|his name (abs.) || pencil (ins.) || he wrote
|-
|colspan=3|"he wrote his name with the pencil"
|}
{|
|-
|нэрыплъымкӏэ|| елъэгъу
|-
|нэрыплъ-ымкӏэ|| елъэгъу
|-
| || 
|-
|binocular (ins.) || (s)he is seeing
|-
|colspan=2|"(s)he is seeing with (using) the binocular"
|}

{|
|-
| кӏалэр ||адыгэбзэкӏэ|| мэгущыӏэ
|-
| кӏалэ-р ||адыгэбзэ-кӏэ|| мэгущыӏэ
|-
| ||  || 
|-
|boy (arg.) || using Adyghe language (ins.) || (s)he is speaking
|-
|colspan=3|"The boy is speaking (using) Adyghe language."
|}

Marking the direction of action:
 гъогу /ʁʷaɡʷ/ road → гъогумкӏэ /ʁʷaɡʷəmt͡ʃʼa/ from the road (direction).
 унэ /wəna/ house → унэмкӏэ /wənamt͡ʃʼa/ from the house.
 хы /xə/ sea → хымкӏэ /xəmt͡ʃʼa/ from the sea (direction).
 Америкэ /aːmerika/ America → Америкэмкӏэ /aːmerikamt͡ʃʼa/ from America (direction).
{|
|-
|хымкӏэ || жьыбгъэр || къэкӏы
|-
|хы-мкӏэ || жьыбгъэ-р || къэ-кӏы
|-
| || ||
|-
|sea (ins.) || the wind (abs.) || come
|-
|colspan=3|"the wind comes from the sea."
|}
{|
|-
|унэмкӏэ || кӏалэхэр || макӏох
|-
|унэ-мкӏэ || кӏалэ-хэ-р || макӏо-х
|-
| || ||
|-
|house(ins.) || the boys (abs.) || they are going
|-
|colspan=3|"The boys are going toward the house's direction."
|}

Adverbial case
Has the suffix -эу  (e.g. кӏалэу   'boy'), шэу  'horse'). This case has a number of functions:

Marking the profession or role of the subject (similar to the English word "as"):
{|
|-
|лӏыр || кӏэлэегъаджэу || мэлажьэ
|-
|лӏыр || кӏэлэегъадж-эу || мэлажьэ
|-
|  ||  ||
|-
| man (abs.) || as a teacher (adv.) || (s)he is working
|-
|colspan=3|"The man is working as a teacher."
|}

{|
|-
|укӏалэу || сыд || мыщ || епӏуалӏэрэр?
|-
|у-кӏалэ-у || сыд || мыщ || е-п-ӏуа-лӏэ-рэ-р?
|-
|  ||  ||  || 
|-
| as a boy (adv.) || what || this || the thing you say about this
|-
|colspan=4|"As a boy, what you think about this?"
|}

{|
|-
| лӏыр || тхьэматэу || дзэм || хэхьагъ
|-
| лӏы-р || тхьэматэ-у || дзэ-м || хэхьагъ
|-
|  ||  ||  || 
|-
| man (abs.) || as a leader (adv.) || army (obl.) || (s)he entered
|-
|colspan=4|"The man joined the army as an officer."
|}

Marking a relative clause (works like the English words "that", "who", "whom" and "whose" in the sentences: "the boy who went", "the man that was eating", "the girl whom I saw" and "the woman whose shirt is beautiful"), for example:

макӏорэ "the one who goes" → кӏалэ-у макӏорэ "the boy who goes".
еплъырэ "the one who looks" → пшъашъэ-у еплъырэ "the girl who looks".
зеплъырэ "the one whom (s)he looks at" → пшъашъэ-у зеплъырэ "the girl whom (s)he looks at".
гитарэ еорэ "the one who plays guitar" → лӏэ-у гитарэ еорэ "the man who plays guitar".
лӏыр зеорэ "the thing the man plays" → лӏыр гитарэ-у зеорэ "the guitar the man plays".

{|
|-
| лӏэу || мэзым || хэтым || кӏэрахъо || ыӏыгъ
|-
| лӏы-эу || мэзы-м || хэт-ым || кӏэрахъо || ыӏ-ыгъ
|-
|  ||  ||  ||  || 
|-
| man (adv.) || forest (erg.) || the one that is standing in (erg.) || gun || (s)he has a
|-
|colspan=5|"The man that is in the forest has a gun."
|}

{|
|-
| дзакӏохэу || къэкӏуагъэхэмкӏэ || заур || тыхьыщт
|-
| дзакӏо-хэ-у || къэкӏуагъэхэ-мкӏэ || зау-р || тыхьыщт
|-
|  ||  ||  || 
|-
| soldiers (adv.) || with the ones that came (ins.) || the war (abs.) || we will take
|-
|colspan=4|"we will win the war with the soldiers that came."
|}

{|
|-
| лӏыжъэу || щысыгъэр  ||кӏожьыгъэ 
|-
| лӏыжъэ-у || щысыгъэ-р  ||кӏожьыгъэ 
|-
|  ||  ||
|-
| old man (adv.) || the one that sit || (s)he returned
|-
|colspan=3|"The old man who had sat there, left."
|}

Expresses the transition of the subject into something
{|
|-
|лӏыр || профессорэу || хъугъэ
|-
|лӏыр || профессор-эу || хъу-гъэ
|-
|  ||  ||
|-
| man (abs.) || professor (adv.) || (s)he became
|-
|colspan=3|"The man became a professor."
|}

{|
|-
|унапэ || плъыжьэу || хъугъэ
|-
|у-напэ || плъыжьы-эу || хъу-гъэ
|-
|  ||  ||
|-
| your face || red (adv.) || (s)he became
|-
|colspan=3|"Your face became red."
|}

{|
|-
|лӏыр || тхьэматэу || дзэм || къикӏыжъыгъ
|-
|лӏы-р || тхьэматэ-у || дзэ-м || къикӏыжъыгъ
|-
|  ||  || ||
|-
| man (abs.) || leader (adv.) || army (obl.) || (s)he returned
|-
|colspan=4|"The man has returned from the army as an officer."
|}

Pro-drop
Adyghe is a pro-drop language. The subject and the object pronouns are sometimes omitted when verb conjugations reflect number and person.

 Both subject and object are mentioned :
{|
|-
|кӏалэм|| пшъашъэр ||елъэгъу
|-
|кӏалэ-м|| пшъашъэ-р ||елъэгъу
|-
| ||  || 
|-
|the boy (erg.) || the girl (abs.) || (s)he is seeing
|-
|colspan=3|"the boy is seeing the girl"
|}

 If the direct object is dropped :
{|
|-
|кӏалэм|| елъэгъу
|-
|кӏалэ-м|| елъэгъу
|-
| || 
|-
|the boy (erg.) || (s)he is seeing
|-
|colspan=2|"the boy is seeing him/her/it"
|}

 If the subject is dropped :
{|
|-
|пшъашъэр|| елъэгъу
|-
|пшъашъэ-р|| елъэгъу
|-
| || 
|-
|the girl (abs.) || (s)he is seeing
|-
|colspan=2|"(s)he is seeing the girl"
|}

 Both subject and object are dropped :
{|
|-
|елъэгъу
|-
|елъэгъу
|-
|
|-
|(s)he is seeing
|-
|colspan=1|"(s)he is seeing him/her/it"
|}

Noun and adjective
In Adyghe, if a noun is accompanied by an adjective, the adjective is placed after the noun and it takes the noun case suffix.

Absolutive case 
{|
|-
|пшъэшъэ || дахэр || макӏо
|-
||| || 
|-
| girl || the pretty (abs.)  || (s)he is going
|-
|colspan=3|"the pretty girl is going"
|}

Ergative case
{|
|-
|кӏалэ || кӏыхьэм || ешхы || мыер
|-
| ||  ||  || 
|-
| boy || the long (erg.) || he is eating a/the || the apple (abs.)
|-
|colspan=4|"the long boy is eating the apple"
|}

Instrumental case 
{|
|-
|къэлэм || папцӏэмкӏэ || сэтхэ
|-
| ||  || 
|-
| pencil || sharp (ins.) || I am writing
|-
|colspan=3|"I am writing with (using) the sharp pencil"
|}

Adverbial case 
{|
|-
| пшъашъэр || пшъэшъэ дахэу || хъущт
|-
|  ||  || 
|-
| the girl (abs.)|| pretty girl (adv.) || (s)he will turn
|-
|colspan=3|"the girl will become a pretty girl"
|}

Participle
Participles in Adyghe are formed by adding any of the noun cases to the verbs. It is possible to indicate the subject or the object of a verb as a noun.

For example, макӏо /maːkʷʼa/ "(s)he is going" to макӏорэр /maːkʷʼarar/ "the one that is going". The forms of nouns that were created from verbs in different grammatical cases are equal to the forms of the appropriate verbs. The same is also true for their time-tenses, for example :

{|
|-
| макӏорэм || ылъэгъугъ || моу ||щычъыягъэр
|-
| макӏо-рэ-м || ылъэгъу-гъ || моу || щы-чъые-агъ-эр
|-
| ||  ||  || 
|-
| the one that is going (erg.) || (s)he saw || here || the one that slept at that place (abs.)
|-
|colspan=3|"The one who is going saw the one that slept here."
|}

Because Adyghe is an ergative–absolutive language, the transitivity of the verb is the main factor determining the choice of the subject case, meaning the subject or the object of a verb can take different cases depending whatever the verb is intransitive or transitive.

There are two ways to form a participle: 
Adding the suffix ~рэ to a verb.
Adding the prefix з~ and the suffix ~рэ to a verb.

In intransitive verbs, the suffix ~рэ indicates an indefinite subject, while combination of the prefix з~ and the suffix ~рэ indicate an indefinite object:

 макӏорэ - "the one who is going"
 еплъырэ - "the one who is looking"
 дэгущыӏэрэ - "the one who is speaking with" 
 зеплъырэ - "the one (s)he is looking at"
 здэгущыӏэрэ - "the one (s)he is speaking with"

In transitive verbs, the suffix ~рэ indicates an indefinite object, while combination of the prefix з~ and the suffix ~рэ indicate an indefinite subject:

 ылъэгъурэ - "the one (s)he is seeing"
 ышхырэ - "the thing (s)he is eating"
 ыдзырэ - "the thing (s)he throws" 
 зылъэгъурэ - "the one who sees it"
 зышхырэ - "the one who eats it"
 зыдзырэ - "the one who throws it"

Thus to summarize, the following table shows when it indicates an indefinite subject and when it indicates an indefinite object:

Here are some more couple examples in both transitive and intransitive verbs:

 Examples of sentences with intransitive verbs :

{|
|-
|кӏалэм|| еплъырэр || пшъашъэр
|-
|кӏалэ-м|| еплъы-рэ-р || пшъашъ-эр
|-
| ||  || 
|-
| the boy (erg.) || the one that is looking at him/her || the girl (abs.)
|-
|colspan=3|"the one that is looking at the boy is the girl."
|}

{|
|-
| кӏалэр || тхьылъэу ||зеджэрэм || еплъ
|-
| кӏалэ-р || тхьылъ-эу ||з-еджэ-рэ-м || еплъ
|-
| ||  ||  || 
|-
| boy (abs.) || book (adv.) || the thing (s)he is reading (erg.) || look
|-
|colspan=4|"look at the book the boy is reading."
|}

 Examples of sentences with transitive verbs :
{|
|-
|кӏалэм || ылъэгъурэр || пшъашъэр
|-
|кӏалэ-м || з-илъэгъу-рэ-р || пшъашъэ-р
|-
| ||  || 
|-
| boy (erg.) || the one (s)he is seeing || the girl (abs.)
|-
|colspan=3|"the one the boy is seeing is the girl."
|}

{|
|-
|тары || цӏыфэу || уукӏыгъагъэр?
|-
|тары || цӏыфэ-у || у-укӏы-гъагъэ-р?
|-
| ||  || 
|-
| which || person (adv.) || the one you killed (abs.)
|-
|colspan=3|"which person have you killed?"
|}

Possession
In Circassian, there are two ways to express possession:

 The prefix и /jə/ refers to the possessed object; for example: ащ икӏалэ "his/her boy".
 The prefix зи /zjə/ refers to the possessor of the object; for example: ар зикӏалэ "(s)he who owns the boy".

Examples with the prefix и~:

{|
|-
|пшъашъэм|| ичэтыу || фыжьы
|-
| ||  || 
|-
| the girl (erg.) || his/her cat || white
|-
|colspan=3|"The cat of the girl is white"
|}

{|
|-
|чылэм|| итхьэматэ || сият
|-
| ||  || 
|-
| village (erg.)|| its leader || my father
|-
|colspan=3|"the major of the village is my father"
|}

{|
|-
|кӏалэм || ищэн || дахэ
|-
| ||  || 
|-
| the boy (erg.) || his/her behavior || beautiful
|-
|colspan=3|"the boy's behavior is appropriate"
|}

Examples with the prefix зи~:

{|
|-
|хэт || зицӏэр || Том
|-
| ||  || 
|-
| who || the one who named || Tom (name)
|-
|colspan=3|"Who is the one named Tom?"
|}

{|
|-
|мыр|| зимащинэм || къысиӏуагъ || шъунэмысынэу
|-
| ||  ||   || 
|-
| this || the owner of the car || (s)he told me || don't touch it (said to plural)
|-
|colspan=4|"The owner of this car told me that you (plural) shouldn't touch it."
|}

{|
|-
|унэр || зиер || лӏы
|-
| ||  || 
|-
| house (abs.) || the owner of || a man
|-
|colspan=3|"The owner of the house is a man."
|}

Creating nouns from adjective
In Adyghe someone (person) or something (animal, plant, object) that have a specific adjective can be

presented with the adjective word with the additional noun case suffix (absolutive, ergative, etc.) For

example:
дахэ /daːxa/ - pretty → дахэр /daːxar/ - the pretty person (absolutive case).
ашӏу /aːʃʷʼə/ - tasty → ашӏухэр /aːʃʷʼəxar/ - the tasty ones (absolutive case).
мэзахэ /mazaːxa/ - dark → мэзахэм /mazaːxam/ - in the dark (ergative case).
чъыӏэ /t͡ʂəʔa/ - cold → чъыӏэм /t͡ʂəʔam/ - in the cold (ergative case).

{|
|-
| кӏуачӏэхэр || тиунэ || къэгъакӏох
|-
| кӏуачӏэ-хэ-р|| ти-унэ  ||къэ-гъа-кӏо-х 
|-
| ||  || 
|-
| the strong ones (abs.) || our house || make them come 
|-
|colspan=3|"bring the strong ones to our house"
|}

{|
|-
| унэм || шъукъихьэжь || чъыӏэм  || шъуигъэсмэджэщт
|-
| унэ-м || шъу-къ-ихьэ-жь || чъыӏэ-м  || шъуи-гъэ-смэджэ-щт
|-
| ||  || ||
|-
| house (erg.) || get inside (to plural) || the cold (erg.) || it will make you (plural) sick
|-
|colspan=4|"get inside the house, the cold will make you sick (said to plural)"
|}

{|
|-
| сымаджэхэмэ || шъукъадж || япэу
|-
| сымаджэ-хэ-мэ || шъу-къадж  || япэ-эу
|-
| ||  ||
|-
| the sick ones (egs.) || call them (said to plural) || firstly
|-
|colspan=3|"First call the sick ones. (said to plural)"
|}

In Adyghe any adjective that is measurable or comparable can be turned into a noun by adding the

suffix -агъэ /-aːʁa/, for example:
дахэ /daːxa/ - pretty → дахагъэ /daːxaːʁa/ - beauty.
кӏуачӏэ /kʷʼaːt͡ʃʼa/ - strong → кӏуачӏагъэ /kʷʼaːt͡ʃʼaːʁa/ - strength.
псао /psaːwa/ - whole, fine → псэуагъэ /psawaːʁa/ - health condition.
делэ // - fool → делагъэ /ːʁa/ - foolishness.
псынкӏэ /psənt͡ʃʼa/ - fast → псынкӏагъэ /psənt͡ʃʼaːʁa/ - speed.
ӏазэ /ʔaːza/ - skilled → ӏэзагъэ /ʔazaːʁa/ - skill.

{|
|-
| Сянэ || ипсэуагъэ || сыфэгуаӏэ
|-
| С-янэ || и-псэу-агъэ || сы-фэ-гуаӏэ
|-
| ||  || 
|-
| my mother || his/her health condition || I worry for him/her 
|-
|colspan=3|"The worry for my mother's health condition"
|}

Derivation
Сomposition and suffixation are the most typical ways to form Circassian nouns. There are different ways of composing words, for example: мэзчэ́т (мэз "forest", чэт "chicken"), псычэ́т (псы "water", чэт "chicken", duck), мэкъумэ́щ "agriculture" (мэкъу "hay", мэщы́ "millet"), шхапӏэ "cafeteria" (шхэн "eat", пӏэ "place").

The following suffixes are used to form Circassian nouns:

Declension
Adyghe language